Dança dos Famosos 2022 is the nineteenth season of the Brazilian reality television show Dança dos Famosos which premiered on 	April 3, 2022 at  (BRT / AMT) on TV Globo, following a cast reveal special that aired on March 27.

It is the first season hosted by Luciano Huck and airing as a segment on Domingão com Huck, following Fausto Silva's departure from the network and, subsequently, the cancellation of Domingão do Faustão.

On July 3, 2022, actress Vitória Strada & Wagner Santos won the competition over singer Vitão & Gabe Cardoso and TV host Ana Furtado & Leandro Azevedo, who took 2nd and 3rd place respectively. Vitória is the show's third openly LGBT celebrity champion (following season 7 champion Fernanda Souza and season 9 champion Rodrigo Simas) and the first to be out at the time of her win.

Couples
The celebrities and professionals were officially revealed by TV Globo on March 27, 2022. However, the couples were not announced in advance and will only be revealed during the two-week season premiere.

Elimination chart

Weekly results

Week 1 
Week 1 – Women
Style: Forró

Running order

Week 2 
Week 1 – Men
Style: Forró

Running order

Week 3 
Week 2 – Women
Style: Rock

Running order

Week 4 
Week 2 – Men
Style: Rock

Running order

Week 5 
Week 3 – Women
Style: Funk

Running order

Week 6 
Week 3 – Men
Style: Funk

Running order

Week 7 
Dance-off
Style: Reggaeton

Running order

Week 8
Group 1
Style: Sertanejo

Running order

Week 9
Group 2
Style: Sertanejo

Running order

Week 10
Top 6 
Style: Salsa

Running order

Week 11
Top 5
Style: Tango

Running order

Week 12
Top 5 Redux – Semifinals
Style: Contemporary

Running order

Week 13
Top 3 – Finals
Styles: Waltz & Samba

Running order

References

External links
 Dança dos Famosos on Gshow.com

2022 Brazilian television seasons
Season 19